An All-American team is an honorary sports team composed of the best amateur players of a specific season for each team position—who in turn are given the honorific "All-America" and typically referred to as "All-American athletes", or simply "All-Americans". Although the honorees generally do not compete together as a unit, the term is used in U.S. team sports to refer to players who are selected by members of the national media.  Walter Camp selected the first All-America team in the early days of American football in 1889.  The 2020 NCAA Men's Basketball All-Americans are honorary lists that include All-American selections from the Associated Press (AP), the United States Basketball Writers Association (USBWA), the Sporting News (TSN), and the National Association of Basketball Coaches (NABC) for the 2019–20 NCAA Division I men's basketball season. All selectors choose three teams, while AP also lists honorable mention selections.

The Consensus 2020 College Basketball All-American team was determined by aggregating the results of the four major All-American teams as determined by the National Collegiate Athletic Association (NCAA). Since United Press International was replaced by TSN in 1997, the four major selectors have been the aforementioned ones. AP has been a selector since 1948, NABC since 1957 and USBWA since 1960.  To earn "consensus" status, a player must win honors based on a point system computed from the four different all-America teams. The point system consists of three points for first team, two points for second team and one point for third team. No honorable mention or fourth team or lower are used in the computation. The top five totals plus ties are first team and the next five plus ties are second team.

Although the aforementioned lists are used to determine consensus honors, there are numerous other All-American lists. The ten finalists for the John Wooden Award are described as Wooden All-Americans. The ten finalists for the Senior CLASS Award are described as Senior All-Americans.  Other All-American lists include those determined by USA Today, Fox Sports, Yahoo! Sports and many others. The scholar-athletes selected by College Sports Information Directors of America (CoSIDA) are termed Academic All-Americans.

2020 Consensus All-America team

PG – Point guard
SG – Shooting guard
PF – Power forward
SF – Small forward
C – Center

Individual All-America teams

By player

By team

AP Honorable Mention:
Saddiq Bey, Villanova
Mason Jones, Arkansas
Daniel Oturu, Minnesota
Immanuel Quickley, Kentucky
Marcus Zegarowski, Creighton

Academic All-Americans
The College Sports Information Directors of America (CoSIDA) announced its 15-member 2020 Academic All-America team on March 9, 2020, divided into first, second and third teams with Skylar Mays of LSU chosen as men's college basketball Academic All-American of the Year.

Senior All-Americans
The 10 finalists for the Senior CLASS Award, called Senior All-Americans, were announced on February 5, 2020. On March 31, Markus Howard was announced as the recipient, with the first and second teams also announced at that time.

First team

Second team

References

All-Americans
NCAA Men's Basketball All-Americans